Mustankallio water tower lies in the Kiveriö district of Lahti, Finland, and stands  tall.  Completed by a local company in 1963, it includes two water reservoirs, a penthouse meeting facility complete with sauna, and a viewing platform.  The design, which features pre-stressed concrete elements and asbestos cement cladding, was a departure from the steel water tower structures commonly built in the region.   When commissioned, its original name was the Metelinmäki Water Tower.  It has been described as crocus-like in appearance and complimented on its elegance.

Design and construction 
Water towers in the region, many of which were built in the 19th century, had previously been built from steel.  They have been described as "ugly and uninspiring" and "marring the skyline".  This structure, designed by Ing. Büro Paavo Simula and Company, was intended to be more aesthetic to minimise its effect on the visual environment.  It stands on Mustankallio hill.

The tower was completed in 1963 by local construction firm B&K.  It is constructed of pre-stressed concrete elements built locally, under license from the German Dyckerhoff & Widmann (Dywidag) company. The exterior is clad with asbestos cement panels.

The structure has received praise for its "striking appearance" and "elegant lines". The design has been described as crocus-like.

Use 
The water company Lahti Aqua owns the tower and uses it to store water for distribution to the town.  At night water is pumped into the tank from lower-level storage, during the day water is drained via gravity feed and hydrostatic pressure  from the tank for distribution to Mustankallio, Kiveriö, Tonttila and Pyhättömänmäki.

The tower contains a viewing platform with good views across the town.  The tower also contains a meeting room capable of housing 30 to 40 people, a sauna that can accommodate 15, a lounge, kitchen, toilet and showers. The facilities are available for rent between 8 a.m. and midnight.  Small-sized lifts offer access to the facilities.

In 2015, the facade exterior panels were replaced.

It is part of the motif in the 2021 Ironman 70.3 Ironman Triathlon Finland medal.

See also
 Kuwait Water Towers, for an organic "mushroom farm" look by Swedish designers and engineers
 List of tallest towers

References

External links
 
 
 

Asbestos
Buildings and structures in Päijät-Häme
Towers completed in 1963
Water towers in Finland